Reece "Goose" Tatum (May 31, 1921 – January 18, 1967) was an American Negro league baseball and basketball player. In 1942, he was signed to the Harlem Globetrotters and had an 11-year career with the team. He later formed his own team known as the Harlem Magicians with former Globetrotters player Marques Haynes. He is a member of the Naismith Memorial Basketball Hall of Fame and the Arkansas Sports Hall of Fame. Tatum's number 50 is retired by the Globetrotters.

Biography
Reece "Goose" Tatum was born in El Dorado, Arkansas on May 31, 1921 to Ben and Alice Tatum. Ben Tatum was a farmer and part-time preacher. Alice Tatum was a domestic cook. Reece Tatum was the fifth of seven children. He attended Booker T. Washington High School in El Dorado, Arkansas, but it is unknown if he graduated. He was a three-sport star in baseball, basketball and football during high school.

After high school, Tatum pursued a career in professional baseball and joined the Louisville Black Colonels in 1937. He played for the Memphis Red Sox and the Birmingham Black Barons in 1941 and 1942, respectively. Tatum served in the United States Army Air Forces during World War II.

Harlem Globetrotters owner and coach Abe Saperstein signed Tatum in 1942. Tatum was released by the Globetrotters in 1955 after 11 seasons. At the time of his release, he was making a reported $53,000 per year, which The Detroit Tribune noted was the highest salary made by a professional basketball player. Saperstein told the press Tatum's release was due to his violation of team rules and repeated absences from games.

Tatum and Marques Haynes, who were both Harlem Globetrotters players, formed a barnstorming basketball team of their own: The Fabulous Harlem Magicians. Dempsey Hovland, owner of 20th Century Booking Agency, was recruited to book the Harlem Magicians' games. Hovland earlier had managed the barnstorming House of David basketball team.

Personal life and legal incidents
In February 1955, Tatum filed a lawsuit against the owners of the San Francisco, California based Pan-American Bar for refusing to serve him, his wife and three companions on account of their race. Tatum was asking for $13,000 in damages. Tatum was arrested in Gary, Indiana in November 1955 for non-payment of alimony. He allegedly owed his ex-wife $7,000 in alimony and was ordered by Judge Anthony Roszkowski to pay $60 a week pending a final judgment.

Tatum was married briefly to Lottie 'the Body' Graves who he met in San Francisco.

Death and legacy
In 1966, Tatum's son, Goose Jr., was killed in a car accident. Soon after, Tatum began drinking heavily which led to a series of hospital visits. He died at his home in El Paso, Texas on January 18, 1967, at the age of 45. The official autopsy stated that he died of natural causes. Tatum was interred in the Fort Bliss National Cemetery.

Tatum is considered to be the original "clown prince"—a term first applied to seminal Chicago Crusader/Philadelphia Giant Jackie Bethards in 1933—of the Trotters.  He wove numerous comic routines into his play, many of which achieved cult status. Some of these routines were based on his stature—at 6'4", it is reported that he had an arm span of about 84 inches (210& cm) and could touch his kneecaps without bending.
Tatum is credited with inventing the hook shot. While playing for the Harlem Magicians, Tatum was billed as having scored the most points in the history of basketball, but the assertion is dubious.

In 1974, Tatum was inducted into the Arkansas Sports Hall of Fame. His number 50 jersey was retired by the Harlem Globetrotters on February 8, 2002 and his name was placed on the Globetrotters' "Legends Ring" at Madison Square Garden in New York City. Tatum was the fourth player to have his number retired by the Globetrotters. In 2011, Tatum was elected to the Naismith Memorial Basketball Hall of Fame.

Footnotes
 Some sources list Tatum's birth date as May 3, 1921, in Hermitage, Arkansas.

References

External links
 and Seamheads

1921 births
1967 deaths
African-American baseball players
African-American basketball players
United States Army Air Forces personnel of World War II
Baseball players from Arkansas
Basketball players from Arkansas
Birmingham Black Barons players
Cincinnati Clowns players
Detroit Stars players
Harlem Globetrotters players
Indianapolis Clowns players
Memphis Red Sox players
Naismith Memorial Basketball Hall of Fame inductees
People from El Dorado, Arkansas
United States Army Air Forces soldiers
African-American United States Army personnel
American men's basketball players
20th-century African-American sportspeople
African Americans in World War II